The House of Skaramangi was a historical structure on Petrovsky Street in the city of Taganrog in the Rostov Oblast.

History and description 
Luka Petrovich Skaramanga built a single-story house at 53 Petrovsky Street in the first half of the 19th century. In 1834, Skaramanga was a member of a local commission to improve the condition of the harbor and the related embankment.

From 1873 to 1880 the house was owned by the merchant Ivan Amvrosiyevich Skaramanga, who owned a brick manufacturing company.

In 1890 the house belonged to Ivan Skaramanga, who was married to Virginia Mikhaelovna. They had three daughters (Elizabeth, Maria and Virginia) and three sons (Ambrose, Mikhail and Panteleymon). The Skaramanga family's wealth grew, and they bought houses at 95 and 97 Grecheskaya Street, in Petrovsky Street, and at the Merchant exchange.

Other documents suggest 53 Petrovsky Street could be related to the Greek office Skaramanga, Manusi which was closed in 1893. This business imported tea, coffee, citrus fruits and exported wheat, cake, and vegetable oils.

In 1898 documents show the house was owned by Virginia, the widow of Ivan.

In 1923 the house became an orphanage, which was demolished in the 21st century.

References 

Tourist attractions in Taganrog
Buildings and structures in Taganrog